For articles on Irish television in the 2010s please see:
2010 in Irish television
2011 in Irish television
2012 in Irish television
2013 in Irish television
2014 in Irish television
2015 in Irish television
2016 in Irish television
2017 in Irish television
2018 in Irish television
2019 in Irish television

 
Television in Ireland